Hamoşam (also, Hamuşam, Həmoşam, Hamosam, Khamosham, and Khimosham) is a village and municipality in the Astara Rayon of Azerbaijan.  It has a population of 1,750.  The municipality consists of the villages of Hamoşam, Klinbi, Rivadila, and Rıqloba.

Notable natives 

 Mirza Jabiyev — Hero of the Soviet Union.

References

External links

Populated places in Astara District